Vincent Phillip Muñoz is an American political scientist. He is the Tocqueville Associate Professor in the Department of Political Science  and Concurrent Associate Professor of Law at the University of Notre Dame. He is the author of two books on the principles of the American Founding focusing on religious liberty and the separation of church and state in the United States.

Early life
Vincent Phillip Muñoz graduated from Claremont McKenna College, where he earned a bachelor of arts degree in 1993. He went on to earn a master of arts degree from Boston College in 1995 and a PhD from the Claremont Graduate University in 2001.

Career
Muñoz is the Tocqueville Associate Professor of Political Science at the University of Notre Dame. He is also the founding director of Notre Dame Center for Citizenship & Constitutional Government (formerly the Tocqueville Program for Inquiry into Religion and Public Life and the Potenziani Program in Constitutional Studies). In March 2017, Muñoz invited Charles Murray to campus despite opposition from junior faculty and students; he argued in an op-ed and speech at the Department of Justice that honoring the invitation to Murray to speak was a matter of free speech.

Muñoz authored God and the Founders: Madison, Washington, and Jefferson in 2009. The book analyzes the different positions on church and state of three Founding Fathers (James Madison, George Washington and Thomas Jefferson) and contextualizes them in modern-day judicial conundra like school prayers or public funding of religious institutions. It won the Hubert Morken Award from the American Political Science Association in 2011.

The book was widely reviewed. In Perspectives on Politics, Professor Isaac Kramnick of Cornell University, called it a "very important book", although he regretted Muñoz's decision to look at only three founders, concluding that other founders could illuminate modern-day jurists further. Meanwhile, in Law and History Review, Professor Mark D. McGarvie of the College of William and Mary argued that the ahistorical nature of the analysis was problematic, but that the book was nevertheless engaging. Professor Ellis M. West of the University of Richmond dismissed the book for lacking "balance and nuance", despite recognizing that Muñoz is correct to argue that "none of the Founders believed that religious liberty gave people the right to be exempt from obeying valid laws that unintentionally burden the exercise of their religion." Furthermore, in Revue française de science politique, Professor François Foret of the Université libre de Bruxelles praised Muñoz for laying out the differences between the Founders. Finally, in a review for the Journal of the Early Republic, Professor Mark Y. Hanley of Truman State University praised the book for "granting the founders their separate ways while acknowledging the continuing vitality of their political and philosophical ideas that can still offer Constitutional guidance in a new century."

Muñoz edited a second book, Religious Liberty and the American Supreme Court: The Essential Cases and Documents, in 2015. It is a collection of Supreme Court cases on religious liberty, with annotations by Muñoz.

Muñoz’s won a National Endowment for the Humanities fellowship to support his second book, Religious Liberty and the American Founding: Natural Rights and the Original Meanings of the First Amendment Religion Clauses, published by the University of Chicago Press. It continues his presentation of the Founders’ philosophy and constitutionalism of religious liberty, focusing on the Founding-era state constitutions and the drafting and adoption of the First Amendment. Muñoz argues that the Founders conceived religious liberty as an inalienable natural right. The book concludes with a natural rights constitutional construction of the First Amendment’s religion clauses.

Works

Religious Liberty and the American Founding: Natural Rights and the Original Meanings of the First Amendment Religion Clauses (University of Chicago Press, 2022)

References

Living people
Claremont McKenna College alumni
Boston College alumni
Claremont Graduate University alumni
University of Notre Dame faculty
American political scientists
Year of birth missing (living people)